Derbyshire County Cricket Club in 1920 was the English cricket club Derbyshire's  fiftieth season. It was the club's twenty-second season in the County Championship and the most disastrous season ever experienced by any side since the County Championship was established.  Derbyshire lost 17 of the 18 matches played and the other was abandoned without a ball being bowled.

1920 season
John Chapman was captain for the season, having held the post twice before World War I. The team was very unstable. Thirty eight players played for Derbyshire in the season, but only six played in more than half the matches. The club suffered from the absence of devastating bowler Billy Bestwick for all but one match, in which he took seven wickets, while other players such as Thomas Forrester and Arnold Warren were drawing to the end of their career. Leonard Oliver was top scorer and Arthur Morton with 89 wickets did the bulk of the bowling with Samuel Cadman. Oliver and Morton were the only players to score centuries.

Fifteen players made their debut in the season, half of them playing three or fewer matches. The most significant additions to the side were Harry Storer and wicket keeper Harry Elliott both of whom had long careers with the club and were members of the 1936 championship winning team. Newcomers Wilfred Carter, Jim Hutchinson, William Tomlinson, Anthony Jackson and Robert Bestwick played in several subsequent seasons. Those who only appeared in 1920 were Henry Radford, Kenneth Dobson and Douglas Linathan with three appearances, Albert Woodland and Allen Turner  with two appearances and Geoffrey Brooke-Taylor, Timothy Boden and John Davis who only played one game each.

Matches
{| class="wikitable" style="width:100%;"
|-
! style="background:#efefef;" colspan="6"| List of  matches
|- style="background:#efefef;"
!No.
!Date
!V
!Result 
!Margin
!Notes
|- 
|1
| 15 May 1920 
| Yorkshire  Bramall Lane, Sheffield 
| style="background:#f00;"|Lost 
|Innings and 223 runs
|  Kilner 206*  
|-
|2
|19 May 1920  
| Lancashire  Queen's Park, Chesterfield 
| style="background:#f00;"|Lost 
|Innings and 160 runs
|   Makepeace 132; A Morton 6-73; Cook 7-8 
|-
|3
| 22 May 1920  
| Warwickshire  County Ground, Derby 
| style="background:#f00;"|Lost 
|8 wickets
|  Howell 6-25 and 6-39; A Morton 5-44; SWA Cadman 5-36  
|-
|4
|12 Jun 1920  
| Essex   County Ground, Derby 
| style="background:#f00;"|Lost 
|6 wickets
|  Douglas 8-39; A Morton 5-94; Reeves 5-61  
|-
|5
|19 Jun 1920  
| Northamptonshire    Queen's Park, Chesterfield 
| style="background:#f00;"|Lost 
|114 runs
|   A Morton 5-61 and 6-35; Murdin 5-29 and 6-39
|-
|6
|23 Jun 1920  
| Lancashire   Old Trafford, Manchester 
| style="background:#f00;"|Lost 
|Innings and 228 runs
|   Tyldesley 169 and 5-40; Cook 5-50; Dean 5-26
|-
|7
|03 Jul 1920  
| Nottinghamshire     Queen's Park, Chesterfield 
|Abandoned
|
|    
|-
|8
|07 Jul 1920  
| Leicestershire  Aylestone Road, Leicester 
| style="background:#f00;"|Lost 
|6 wickets
|  King 8-61 and 5-41;W Bestwick 5-41; A Morton 5-33  
|-
|9
|10 Jul 1920  
| Yorkshire  County Ground, Derby 
| style="background:#f00;"|Lost 
|Innings and 71 runs
|   Holmes 104; Robinson 5-20; Rhodes 7-24 
|-
|10
|14 Jul 1920  
|  Sussex     County Ground, Hove 
| style="background:#f00;"|Lost 
|134 runs
|  A Morton 6-60; Cox 7-8  
|-
|11
|17 Jul 1920  
| SomersetCounty Ground, Derby 
| style="background:#f00;"|Lost 
|5 wickets
|   A Morton 8-37; Robson 6-20 
|-
|12
|24 Jul 1920  
| Northamptonshire   County Ground, Northampton 
| style="background:#f00;"|Lost 
|80 runs
|   SWA Cadman 6-34 and 8-70; Wells 6-54 
|-
|13
|31 Jul 1920  
| Warwickshire Edgbaston, Birmingham 
| style="background:#f00;"|Lost 
|220 runs
|  SWA Cadman 5-55; Howell 7-45  
|-
|14
|07 Aug 1920  
|  Sussex     Queen's Park, Chesterfield 
| style="background:#f00;"|Lost 
|Innings and 108 runs
|   WJV Tomlinson 5-53 
|-
|15
|11 Aug 1920  
| Leicestershire  County Ground, Derby 
| style="background:#f00;"|Lost 
|Innings and 14 runs
|  A Morton 105; Astill 5-24  
|-
|16
|14 Aug 1920  
| Essex    Southchurch Park, Southend-on-Sea 
| style="background:#f00;"|Lost 
|104 runs
|  A Morton 5-57; Louden 8-36  
|-
|17
|26 Aug 1920  
| Nottinghamshire    Trent Bridge, Nottingham 
| style="background:#f00;"|Lost 
|197 runs
|  Whysall 142; L Oliver  170; Gunn 123  
|-
|18
|01 Sep 1920  
| Somerset  Clarence Park, Weston-super-Mare 
| style="background:#f00;"|Lost 
|10 wickets
|   Daniell 102; White 7-33 and 5-46 
|-
|

Statistics

County Championship batting averages

County Championship bowling averages

Wicket Keeping
George Beet - Catches 6, Stumping 2
H Elliott - Catches  17, Stumping 9

See also
Derbyshire County Cricket Club seasons
1920 English cricket season
Imperfect season

References

1920 in English cricket
Derbyshire County Cricket Club seasons
English cricket seasons in the 20th century